Arlington National Cemetery is one of two national cemeteries run by the United States Army. Nearly 400,000 people are buried in its 639 acres (259 ha) in Arlington, Virginia. There are about 30 funerals conducted on weekdays and 7 held on Saturday. The other Army cemetery is in Washington, D.C. and is called the U.S. Soldiers' and Airmen's Home National Cemetery. All other national cemeteries are run by the National Cemetery System of the Department of Veterans Affairs.

Arlington National Cemetery was established during the U.S. Civil War after the land the cemetery was built upon, Arlington Estate, was confiscated from the private ownership of Confederate States Army general Robert E. Lee's family following a tax dispute. Listed on the National Register of Historic Places in April 2014, the Arlington National Cemetery Historic District includes the Cemetery, Arlington House, Memorial Drive, the Hemicycle, and Arlington Memorial Bridge.

History

George Washington Parke Custis was the grandson of Martha Dandridge Custis Washington through her first marriage. When his natural father, John Parke Custis died, G.W.P. "Washy" Custis went to live at Mount Vernon where George and Martha Washington raised him as their own son. In 1802, Custis began building Arlington House on land that he inherited from his natural father. When completed in 1818, he intended the house to serve as not only a home but also a memorial to George Washington (his foster father). In 1804, Custis married Mary Lee Fitzhugh. They had four children, but only one, Mary Anna Randolph Custis, survived, and married future Confederate States Army general Robert E. Lee.

Custis's will gave a "life inheritance" to Mary Lee, allowing her to live at and run Arlington Estate for the rest of her life but not enabling her to sell any portion of it. Upon her death, the Arlington estate passed to her eldest son, George Washington Custis Lee. The house was known as the Custis-Lee Mansion in the 20th century.

When Virginia seceded from the Union after the start of the U.S. Civil War at Fort Sumter, Robert E. Lee resigned his commission on April 20, 1861, and took command of the armed forces of the Commonwealth of Virginia, later becoming commander of the Army of Northern Virginia. On May 7, troops of the Virginia militia occupied Arlington and Arlington House. With Confederate forces occupying Arlington's high ground, the capital of the Union was left in an untenable military position. On May 3, General Winfield Scott ordered Brigadier General Irvin McDowell to clear Arlington and the city of Alexandria, Virginia, of all troops not loyal to the United States. Despite not wanting to leave Arlington House, Mary Lee believed her estate would soon be recaptured by federal soldiers. On May 14, she buried many of her family treasures on the grounds and left for her sister's estate at Ravensworth in Fairfax County, Virginia. McDowell occupied Arlington without opposition on May 24.

At the outbreak of the Civil War, most military personnel who died in battle near Washington, D.C., were buried at the United States Soldiers' Cemetery in Washington, D.C., or Alexandria Cemetery in Alexandria, Virginia, but by late 1863 both were nearly full. On July 16, 1862, Congress passed legislation authorizing the U.S. federal government to purchase land for national cemeteries for military dead, and put the U.S. Army Quartermaster General in charge of this program. In May 1864, Union forces suffered large numbers of dead in the Battle of the Wilderness. Quartermaster General Montgomery C. Meigs ordered that an examination of eligible sites be made for the establishment for a large new national military cemetery. Within weeks, his staff reported that Arlington Estate was the most suitable property in the area. The property was high and free from floods (which might unearth graves), it had a view of the District of Columbia, and it was aesthetically pleasing. It was also the home of the leader of the armed forces of the Confederate States of America, and denying Robert E. Lee use of his home after the war was a valuable political consideration. The first military burial at Arlington, for William Henry Christman, was made on May 13, 1864, close to what is now the northeast gate in Section 27. However, Meigs did not formally authorize establishment of burials until June 15, 1864. Arlington did not desegregate its burial practices until President Harry S. Truman issued Executive Order 9981 on July 26, 1948.

The government acquired Arlington at a tax sale in 1864 for $26,800, equal to $ today. Mrs. Lee had not appeared in person but rather had sent an agent, attempting to pay the $92.07 in property taxes (equal to $ today) assessed on the estate in a timely manner. The government turned away her agent, refusing to accept the tendered payment. Custis Lee, heir under his grandfather's will passing the estate in trust to his mother, sued the United States in 1874 claiming ownership of Arlington. On December 9, 1882, the U.S. Supreme Court ruled 5–4 in Lee's favor in United States v. Lee, deciding that Arlington had been confiscated without due process. After that decision, Congress returned the estate to him, and on March 3, 1883, Custis Lee sold it back to the government for $150,000 (equal to $ in ) at a signing ceremony with Secretary of War Robert Todd Lincoln. The land then became a military reservation.

President Herbert Hoover conducted the first national Memorial Day ceremony in Arlington National Cemetery, on May 30, 1929.

Freedman's Village

Beginning in 1863, the federal government used the southern portion of the land now occupied by the cemetery as a settlement for freed slaves, giving the name of "Freedman's Village" to the land. The government constructed rental houses that 1,100 to 3,000 freed slaves eventually occupied while farming  of the estate and receiving schooling and occupational training during the Civil War and after the War's end. The Old Bell Church, founded in 1866, was led by Rev. Robert S. Laws. However, after the Freedman's Village land became part of a military reservation, the government asked the villagers to leave. When some remained, John A. Commerford, the Superintendent of Arlington National Cemetery, asked the Army's Quartermaster General in 1887 to close the Village on the grounds that people living in the Village had been taking trees at night from the cemetery for use as firewood. The Quartermaster General and the Secretary of War then approved Commerford's request. The last of the Village's residents departed after the 56th United States Congress appropriated $75,000 in 1900 (equal to $ today) to settle the government's debts to them.

Expansion
With limited space but large numbers of World War II, Korean War, Vietnam War, and other veterans dying and wanting to be buried at Arlington, the need for additional burial space at the cemetery became a pressing issue. In 1991, Cemetery superintendent John C. Metzler, Jr., implemented a $1.4 million plan to clear a former  parking lot to create space for about 9,000 new grave sites.

The Cemetery received the authority to transfer  of woodland from the NPS-controlled Arlington House in 1996 and 2001,  of land in 1999 from the DoD that was the site of the Navy Annex building,  of land in 1999 from the Department of the Army that was part of Fort Myer,  of land from Arlington County's Southgate Road right-of-way in 2004, and just under  of land from Fort Myer in 2005.

In 2007, Metzler implemented the Millennium Project, a $35 million expansion plan to begin utilizing the Arlington woodland, Fort Myer, and Navy Annex land. The Millennium Project expanded the cemetery's physical boundaries for the first time since the 1960s, and was the largest expansion of burial space at the site since the U.S. Civil War. Several environmental and historical preservation groups criticized Metzler's plans, as did the NPS and the manager of Arlington House.

On March 26, 2013, the Consolidated and Further Continuing Appropriations Act, 2013 (Public Law 113–6) appropriated to the DoD $84 million to plan, design and construct the Millennium Project. The legislation additionally appropriated to the DoD $19 million to study, plan and design a future expansion of the cemetery's burial space.

Arlington Woods expansion controversy

On February 22, 1995, officials of the United States Department of the Interior and the United States Department of the Army signed an agreement to transfer from Arlington House, The Robert E. Lee Memorial, to the Army a part of Arlington Woods, which was located in Section 29 of the NPS at Arlington National Cemetery between Arlington House and Fort Myer. The property transfer, which involved  of NPS land, was intended to permit Metzler to start expanding the cemetery beyond its existing boundaries.

Environmentalists expressed concerns that the agreement would result in the partial destruction of the  remnant of a historically important stand of native trees. A historical marker near the woodland notes that, while visiting Arlington House in 1825, Gilbert du Motier, Marquis de Lafayette had warned Mary Lee Fitzhugh Custis, the wife of George Washington Parke Custis: "Cherish these forest trees around your mansion. Recollect how much easier it is to cut a tree than to make one grow." The marker further notes that the Virginia Native Plant Society had recognized the woodland as being one of the best examples of old growth terraced gravel forest remaining in Virginia.

On September 23, 1996, the National Defense Authorization Act for Fiscal Year 1997 (Public Law 104–201) authorized the Secretary of the Interior to transfer to the Secretary of the Army all of the land in Section 29 that was within an "Arlington National Cemetery Interment Zone" and some of the land in the Section that was within a "Robert E. Lee Memorial Preservation Zone".

On March 5, 1998, the NPS, which is a component of the Department of the Interior, informed the National Capital Planning Commission that it wanted to transfer only  to the cemetery, rather than the  that the 1995 agreement had described. In response, Metzler stated: "I was surprised. But we will continue to work with the Department of Interior and see what happens."

On July 12, 1999, the NPS issued a Federal Register notice that announced the availability of an environmental assessment (EA) for the transfer. The EA stated that the Interment Zone contained the oldest and largest tract of climax eastern hardwood forest in Arlington County. This forest was the same type that once covered the Arlington estate, and had regenerated from trees that were present historically. A forestry study determined that a representative tree was 258 years old. The Interment Zone was also determined to contain significant archeological and cultural landscape resources, in addition to those in the Preservation Zone. The EA described four alternative courses of action.

Another alternative (Alternative 3) would transfer to the cemetery the  Interment Zone, while keeping the  Preservation Zone under NPS jurisdiction. The EA concluded: "Public Law 104-201 directed the Secretary of the Interior to transfer to the Secretary of the Army jurisdiction over the Interment Zone, which is the plan in Alternative 3. Adoption of any of the other alternatives would require legislative action to amend the existing law."

On December 28, 2001, the National Defense Authorization Act for Fiscal Year 2002 (Public Law 107-107) repealed the "obsolete" part of Public Law 104-201 that had authorized the transfer of portions of Section 29 to the Secretary of the Army. The new legislation required the Secretary of the Interior to transfer to the Secretary of the Army within 30 days the approximately  Interment Zone. The transfer therefore involved the entire  of NPS land that the 1995 agreement and Alternative 3 in the 1999 EA had described.

The 2001 legislation required the Secretary of the Army to use the Interment Zone for in-ground burial sites and columbarium. In addition, the legislation required the Secretary of the Interior to manage the remainder of Section 29 "in perpetuity to provide a natural setting and visual buffer for Arlington House, the Robert E. Lee Memorial."

On December 12, 2012, the United States Army Corps of Engineers asked for comments on a draft EA that described a further expansion of Arlington National Cemetery as part of the Millennium Project. The draft EA described seven alternatives. About 640 of the trees were within a 135-year-old portion of Arlington Woods. The draft EA concluded: "Based on the evaluation of environmental impacts....., no significant impacts would be expected from the Proposed Action; therefore, an Environmental Impact Statement will not be prepared and a Finding of No Significant Impact will be prepared and signed."

On March 12, 2013, the Corps of Engineers released a revised EA for the Millennium Project. The revised EA contained copies of a number of public comments on the draft EA that had criticized the project and parts of the EA while proposing alternative locations for new military burials near the cemetery and elsewhere. However, the Department of Forestry of the Commonwealth of Virginia found that, based on information in the draft EA, the project would not have a significant adverse impact on the Commonwealth's forest resources. The revised EA did not change the preferred alternative (Alternative E) or the Army's plans to prepare and sign the Finding of No Significant Impact (FONSI) that the draft EA had described.

On June 5, 2013, after reviewing 100 public comments that it had received on the revised EA, the Corps of Engineers released a final EA and a signed FONSI for the Millennium Project. The Final EA and the FONSI retained Alternative E as the preferred alternative. The final EA stated that, of the 905 trees to be removed, 771 trees were healthy native trees that had diameters between 6 and 41 inches. The project would remove approximately 211 trees from a less than  area containing a portion of a 145-year-old forest that stood within the property boundaries of a historic district that a National Register of Historic Places nomination form for Arlington House had described in 1966. About 491 trees would be removed from an area of trees that was approximately 105 years old. Approximately 203 trees with ages of 50 to 145 years would be removed from a former picnic area. At a public hearing on July 11, 2013, the National Capital Planning Commission approved the site and building plans for the Millennium Project.

Navy Annex property expansion controversy
In 1998, a Congressional proposal to expand the cemetery onto land that the Navy Annex and Fort Myer then occupied led to concerns that Arlington County officials had not been properly consulted, leading to the withdrawal of the proposal. However, the National Defense Authorization Act for Fiscal Year 2000 (Public Law 106–65), which was enacted into law during October 1999, subsequently required the Secretary of Defense to transfer administrative jurisdiction of the  Navy Annex property to the Secretary of the Army. The Act required the Secretary of Defense to demolish the Annex's buildings and prepare the property for use as part of the cemetery, while requiring the Secretary of the Army to incorporate the Annex property into the cemetery.

In January 2013, the county manager of Arlington County, Virginia, and the executive director of the Army National Military Cemeteries (consisting of Arlington National Cemetery and the United States Soldiers' and Airmen's Home National Cemetery) signed a memorandum of understanding (MOU) between the Arlington County Board and the Department of the Army to expand the cemetery even further. Under the tentative plan, Arlington County would give up the easement for Southgate Road (which lies between the Navy Annex property and the cemetery's 2012 boundary), and obtain a narrow easement along the southwest border of the Navy Annex site for a new Southgate Road. In exchange, the Department of Defense would give the Navy Annex parking lot to the county.

The Army would also transfer land west of South Joyce Street to Columbia Pike to Arlington County. Additionally, the Commonwealth of Virginia would convey to the cemetery roughly the northern half of the Virginia Department of Transportation land bounded by South Joyce Street, Columbia Pike, and South Washington Boulevard. The cloverleaf interchange between Columbia Pike and S. Washington Blvd. would be eliminated, and the hairpin turn in Columbia Pike straightened, to provide a safer, more natural exit from S. Washington Blvd. onto Columbia Pike. Although exact acreages were not specified and the plan depended upon the Commonwealth of Virginia's cooperation, the MOU if implemented would have created a more contiguous plot of land for the cemetery.

However, in December 2016, the National Defense Authorization Act for Fiscal Year 2017 (Public Law 114–328) authorized the Secretary of the Army to expand the cemetery by acquiring from Arlington County and the Commonwealth of Virginia by condemnation and other means properties near the cemetery that contain the Southgate Road, South Joyce Street and Washington Boulevard right-of-ways, including the Washington Boulevard-Columbia Pike interchange. The Army then informed the Arlington County government in June 2017 that the Army would no longer pursue a land exchange with the county.

In 2018, the US Army Corps of Engineers announced the expansion would allow for 40,000 to 60,000 additional burials and will incorporate the existing United States Air Force Memorial. Construction of roadways is planned for 2021–2023 and of the actual cemetery 2023–2025. Total cost of the project is $274 million. The Columbia Pike and interchange will be realigned to maximize burial space. The existing Operations Complex will also be relocated south of the Columbia Pike and its current location will become burial space. The expansion is projected to keep the cemetery open into the middle of the century.

2010 mismanagement controversy

On June 9, 2010, United States Secretary of the Army John M. McHugh reprimanded the cemetery's superintendent, John C. Metzler, Jr., and his deputy, Thurman Higgenbotham, after a DOD inspector general's report revealed that cemetery officials had placed the wrong headstones on tombs, buried coffins in shallow graves, and buried bodies on top of one another. Metzler, who had already announced his intention to retire on July 2, 2010, admitted some mistakes had been made but denied allegations of widespread or serious mismanagement. The investigation also found that cemetery employees were burdened in their day-to-day work by "dysfunctional management, lack of established policy and procedures, and an overall unhealthy organizational climate." Both Metzler and Higgenbotham retired soon after the investigation commenced.

In March 2011, as a result of the problems discovered, Kathryn Condon, the recently appointed executive director of the Army National Military Cemeteries, announced that the cemetery's staff had been increased from 102 to 159. She added that the cemetery was also acquiring additional equipment because, "They didn't have the proper equipment to do the job really to the standard they needed to do."

The mismanagement controversy included a limitation on mass media access to funerals, which also proved controversial. Until 2005, the cemetery's administration gave free access, with the family's permission, to the press to cover funerals at the cemetery. According to The Washington Post in 2008, the cemetery gradually imposed increasing restrictions on media coverage of funerals beginning about 2005.

Management turnover
After the cemetery's management controversy began to end, the Army appointed Patrick K. Hallinan the acting superintendent of the cemetery in June 2010. He was promoted permanently to the position in October 2010. Hallinan had previously worked for the Office of Field Programs in the National Cemetery Administration, an agency of the United States Department of Veterans' Affairs. In that capacity, Hallinan had oversight of 131 national cemeteries, national cemetery policy, procedures, and operations. Hallinan was promoted to executive director of the Army National Military Cemeteries upon the retirement of Kathryn Condon in spring 2014.

In May 2014, Hallinan stepped down and was replaced by Jack E. Lechner, Jr. as superintendent of the cemetery. Lechner had been a funeral director for 10 years in the private sector before joining the U.S. Army. He rose to the rank of colonel (retiring in November 2011), having spent 2008 to 2010 as chief of the Supply Division of the Joint Chiefs of Staff, overseeing the equipping of Iraqi and Afghanistan national security forces. Since June 2010, he had served as executive officer and deputy superintendent of the cemetery under Hallinan.

The Army removed Lechner as superintendent of the cemetery in early August 2015 after a performance review "called into question his ability to serve successfully as a senior leader". The Army declined to elaborate further and appointed Hallinan to be the temporary Cemetery superintendent until the Army could find a successor.

Katharine Kelley, a former Army officer and senior executive service civilian employee for the Department of the Army, was appointed Superintendent on March 2, 2017. She moved to another Army position in March 2019.

Charles R. "Ray" Alexander, a former Army colonel and senior executive service civilian employee for the Department of the Army, was appointed Superintendent on February 18, 2020.

Wreaths Across America

In 1992, the Worcester Wreath company in Harrington, Maine, had a surplus at the end of the Christmas holiday season. Recalling a boyhood trip to the cemetery, company founder Morrill Worcester donated to the cemetery 5,000 wreaths to honor the cemetery's dead, with the help of volunteers and a local trucking company. After thirteen years of similar donations, in 2005 a photo of snowy gravestones covered with wreaths at the cemetery received widespread circulation on the internet. Thousands of people called Worcester, wanting to replicate the wreath-laying service at their own veteran cemeteries.  In 2014, volunteers were able to place wreaths in all sections of the cemetery for the first time.

150th anniversary
During May and June 2014, the cemetery celebrated the 150th anniversary of its founding with a month-long series of events, tours, and lectures. During these celebrations, cemetery officials formally re-designated the Old Amphitheater as the James Tanner Amphitheater. James R. Tanner was a Union Army officer who lost both legs during the war. He later became a War Department stenographer, and recorded much of the early evidence in the investigation into the assassination of Abraham Lincoln. He later was active in the Grand Army of the Republic, a Union Army veterans group. Tanner is buried a few yards from the amphitheater.

Sections

The Cemetery is divided into 70 sections, with some sections in the southeast and western part of the cemetery reserved for future expansion. Section 60, in the southeast part of the cemetery, is the burial ground for military personnel killed in the "war on terror" since 2001. Section 21, also known as the Nurses Section, is the burial site for many nurses, and the location of the Spanish–American War Nurses Memorial and the Nurses Memorial. Another sectionChaplains Hillincludes monuments to Jewish, Protestant, and Roman Catholic military chaplains.

In 1901, Confederate soldiers buried at the Soldiers' Home and various locations within Arlington were reinterred in a Confederate section that was authorized by Congress in 1900. On June 4, 1914, the United Daughters of the Confederacy dedicated the Confederate Memorial designed by Moses Ezekiel. Upon his death in 1917, Ezekiel was buried at the base of the monument as he was a veteran of the Confederate army. All Confederate headstones in this section are peaked rather than rounded. The Naming Commission, appointed by Congress, has recommended removing the Confederate memorial down to its foundation.

More than 3,800 formerly enslaved people, called "Contrabands" during the Civil War, are buried in Section 27. Their headstones are designated with the word "Civilian" or "Citizen".

Grave markers, niches, and headstones

The United States Department of Veterans Affairs oversees the National Cemetery Administration's orders for placement of inscriptions and faith emblems at no charge to the estate of the deceased, submitted with information provided by the next of kin that is placed on upright marble headstones or columbarium niche covers. The Department of Veterans Affairs currently offers 63 authorized faith emblems for placement on markers to represent the deceased's faith. Over time this number grew as the result of legal challenges to policy.

Prior to 2007, the United States Department of Veterans Affairs (VA) did not allow the use of the pentacle as an "emblem of belief" on tombstones in military cemeteries. This policy was changed following an out-of-court settlement on April 23 following a series of lawsuits by the family of Patrick Stewart against the VA.

Between 1947 and 2001, privately purchased markers were permitted in the cemetery. The sections in which the cemetery permitted such markers are nearly filled and the cemetery generally does not allow new burials in these sections. Nevertheless, the older sections of the cemetery have a wide variety of private markers placed prior to 2001, including an artillery piece.

There are 32 British Commonwealth war dead burials, 12 from World War I and 20 from World War II and some headstones are Commonwealth War Graves Commission style.

Arlington Memorial Amphitheater

The Tomb of the Unknowns is part of the Arlington Memorial Amphitheater. The Memorial Amphitheater has hosted state funerals and Memorial Day and Veterans Day ceremonies. Ceremonies are also held for Easter. About 5,000 people attend these holiday ceremonies each year. The structure is mostly built of Imperial Danby marble from Vermont. The Memorial Display room, between the amphitheater and the Tomb of the Unknowns, uses Botticino stone, imported from Italy. The amphitheater was the result of a campaign by Ivory Kimball to construct a place to honor America's servicemen/women. Congress authorized the structure on March 4, 1913. Woodrow Wilson laid the cornerstone for the building on October 15, 1915. The cornerstone contained 15 items including a Bible and a copy of the Constitution.

Before the Arlington Memorial Amphitheater was completed in 1921, important ceremonies were held at what is now known as the "Old Amphitheater." This structure sits where Robert E. Lee once had his gardens. The amphitheater was built in 1868 under the direction of Civil War General John A. Logan. Gen. James A. Garfield was the featured speaker at the Decoration Day dedication ceremony, May 30, 1868, later being elected as President of the United States in 1881. The amphitheater has an encircling colonnade with a latticed roof that once supported a web of vines. The amphitheater has a marble dais, known as "the rostrum", which is inscribed with the U.S. national motto found on the Great Seal of the United States, E pluribus unum ("Out of many, one"). The rostrum was designed by General Montgomery C. Meigs, then Quartermaster General of the U.S. Army. The amphitheater seats 1,500 people and has hosted speakers such as William Jennings Bryan.

Memorials

Tomb of the Unknown Soldier

The Tomb of the Unknown Soldier stands on top of a hill overlooking Washington, D.C. One of the more well-attended sites at the cemetery, the tomb is made from Yule marble quarried in Colorado. It consists of seven pieces, with a total weight of 79 short tons (72 metric tons). The tomb was completed and opened to the public April 9, 1932, at a cost of $48,000.

Other unknown servicemen were later placed in crypts there, and it also became known as the Tomb of the Unknowns, though it has never been officially named. The soldiers entombed there are:
 Unknown Soldier of World War I, entombed November 11, 1921; President Warren G. Harding presided
 Unknown Soldier of World War II, interred May 30, 1958; President Dwight D. Eisenhower presided
 Unknown Soldier of the Korean War, also interred May 30, 1958; President Dwight Eisenhower presided again, Vice President Richard Nixon acted as next of kin
 Unknown Soldier of the Vietnam War, interred May 28, 1984; President Ronald Reagan presided. The remains of the Vietnam Unknown were disinterred, under the authority of President Bill Clinton, on May 14, 1998, and were identified as those of Air Force first Lt. Michael J. Blassie, whose family had them reinterred near their home in St. Louis, Missouri. It has been determined that the crypt at the Tomb of the Unknowns that contained the remains of the Vietnam Unknown will remain empty.

The Tomb of the Unknown Soldier has been perpetually guarded since July 2, 1937, by the U.S. Army. The 3rd U.S. Infantry Regiment ("The Old Guard") began guarding the Tomb on April 6, 1948. There is a meticulous routine that the guard follows when watching over the graves. The Tomb Guard:
 Marches 21 steps southward down the black mat behind the Tomb
 Turns left, facing east for 21 seconds
 Turns left, facing north for 21 seconds
 Takes 21 steps down the mat
 Repeats the routine until the soldier is relieved of duty at the changing of the guard

After each turn, the Guard executes a sharp "shoulder-arms" movement to place the weapon on the shoulder closest to the visitors to signify that the Guard stands between the Tomb and any possible threat.

Twenty-one was chosen because it symbolizes the highest military honor that can be bestowedthe 21-gun salute.

At each turn, the guard makes precise movements followed by a loud click of the heels as the soldier snaps them together. The guard is changed every half-hour during daylight in the summer, and every hour during daylight in the winter and every two hours at night (when the cemetery is closed to the public), regardless of weather conditions.

A commemorative stamp was issued on November 11, 1922, the first anniversary of the first entombment picturing the Amphitheater. It encompasses the original Tomb of the Unknown Soldier. The remains of an unidentified American soldier from World War I was entombed on Armistice Day, November 11, 1921, later covered in 1931 by a more elaborate marble sarcophagus.

Other memorials

There are several memorials on the grounds of the cemetery. However, due to the lack of space for burials and the large amount of space that memorials take up, the U.S. Army now requires a joint or concurrent resolution from Congress before it will place new memorials at Arlington.

Near the Tomb of the Unknowns stands the USS Maine Mast Memorial, which commemorates the 266 men who died aboard the USS Maine. The memorial is built around a mast salvaged from the ship's wreckage. The memorial served as the temporary resting place for two foreign heads of state or government who died in exile in the United States during World War II, Manuel L. Quezon of the Philippines and Ignacy Jan Paderewski of Poland.

The Space Shuttle Challenger Memorial was dedicated on May 20, 1986, in memory of the crew of flight STS-51-L, who died during launch on January 28, 1986. Transcribed on the back of the stone is the text of the John Gillespie Magee, Jr. poem High Flight, which was quoted by then President Ronald Reagan when he addressed the disaster. Although many remains were identified and returned to the families for private burial, some were not, and were laid to rest under the marker. Two crew members, Dick Scobee and Michael Smith, are buried in Arlington. On February 1, 2004, NASA Administrator Sean O'Keefe dedicated a similar memorial to those who died when the Shuttle Columbia broke apart during reentry on February 1, 2003. Astronauts Laurel Clark, David Brown, and Michael Anderson, who were killed in the Columbia disaster, are also buried in Arlington.

The Lockerbie Cairn is a memorial to the 270 killed in the bombing of Pan Am Flight 103 over Lockerbie, Scotland. The memorial is constructed of 270 stones, one for each person killed in the disaster. In section 64, a memorial to the 184 victims of the September 11 attacks on the Pentagon was dedicated September 11, 2002. The memorial takes the shape of a pentagon, and lists the names of all the victims that were killed. Unidentified remains from the victims are buried beneath it.

On June 25, 1925, President Calvin Coolidge approved a request to erect a Commonwealth Cross of Sacrifice with the names of all the citizens of the United States who died fighting in the Canadian forces during World War I. The monument was dedicated November 11, 1927, and after the Korean War and World War II the names of US citizens who died in those conflicts were added.

The Laos Memorial, or Lao Veterans of America memorial, dedicated to Lao and Hmong veterans who served with US Special Forces and CIA advisors during the Vietnam War, to defend the Royal Kingdom of Laos from the North Vietnamese invasion of Laos, is located on Grant Avenue near the eternal flame memorial to U.S. President John F. Kennedy.

In 2012, legislation began moving through Congress to approve a "Place of Remembrance" at the cemetery. The memorial will be an ossuary designed to contain fragments of remains which are unidentifiable through DNA analysis. The remains will be cremated before placement in the memorial.

Burial procedures

The flags in the cemetery are flown at half-staff from a half-hour before the first funeral until a half hour after the last funeral each day. Funerals are normally conducted five days a week, excluding weekends.

Funerals, including interments and inurnments, average between 27 and 30 per day. The cemetery conducts approximately 6,900 burials each year.

With more than 400,000 interments, the cemetery has the second-largest number of burials of any national cemetery in the United States. The largest of the 130 national cemeteries is the Calverton National Cemetery, on Long Island, near Riverhead, New York, which conducts more than 7,000 burials each year.

In addition to in-ground burial, the cemetery also has one of the larger columbaria for cremated remains in the country. Four courts are currently in use, each with 5,000 niches. When construction is complete, there will be nine courts with a total of 50,000 niches; capacity for 100,000 remains. Any honorably discharged veteran is eligible for inurnment in the columbarium, if they served on active duty at some point in their career (other than for training).

Burial criteria

Part 553 (Army National Military Cemeteries) of Title 32 of the Code of Federal Regulations (CFR) establishes regulations for the cemetery, including eligibility for interment (ground burial) and inurnment. Due to limited space, the criteria for ground burial eligibility are more restrictive than at other national cemeteries, as well as more restrictive than for inurnment in the columbarium.

The persons specified below are eligible for ground burial in the cemetery, unless otherwise prohibited. The last period of active duty of former members of the armed forces must have ended honorably. Interment may be of casketed or cremated remains.
 Any active-duty member of the armed forces (except those members serving on active duty for training only)
 Any veteran who is retired and eligible for retirement pay from service in the armed forces, including service members retired from a reserve component who served a period of active duty (other than for training)
 Any former member of the armed forces separated honorably prior to October 1, 1949, for medical reasons and who was rated at 30% or greater disabled effective on the day of discharge
 Any former member of the armed forces who has been awarded one of the following decorations:
 Medal of Honor
 Distinguished Service Cross, Navy Cross, or Air Force Cross
 Silver Star
 Purple Heart
 Any former member of the armed forces who served on active duty (other than for training) and who held any of the following positions:
 An elective office of the U.S. Government (such as a term in Congress)
 Office of the Chief Justice of the United States or of an Associate Justice of the Supreme Court of the United States
 An office listed, at the time the person held the position, in 5 USC 5312 or 5313 (Levels I and II of the Executive Schedule)
 The chief of a mission who was at any time during his/her tenure classified in Class I under the provisions of Section 411, Act of August 13, 1946, 60 Stat. 1002, as amended (22 USC 866) or as listed in State Department memorandum dated March 21, 1988
 Any former prisoner of war who, while a prisoner of war, served honorably in the active military, naval, or air service, whose last period of military, naval or air service terminated honorably and who died on or after November 30, 1993
 The spouse, widow or widower, minor child, or permanently dependent child, and certain unmarried adult children of any of the above eligible veterans

 The widow or widower of:
 a member of the armed forces who was lost or buried at sea or fell out of a plane or officially determined to be permanently absent with a status of either missing or missing in action
 a member of the armed forces who is interred in a US military cemetery overseas that is maintained by the American Battle Monuments Commission
 The spouse, minor child, or permanently dependent child of any person already buried in Arlington National Cemetery
 The parents of a minor child, or permanently dependent child whose remains, based on the eligibility of a parent, are already buried at Arlington. A spouse divorced from the primary eligible, or widowed and remarried, is not eligible for interment
 Provided certain conditions are met, a former member of the armed forces may be buried in the same grave with a close relative who is already buried and is the primary eligible

Inurnment criteria for columbarium
Due at least partly to the lack of space at the cemetery for ground burial, standards for inurnment (burial of cremated remains) in the columbarium are currently much less restrictive than for ground burial at the cemetery. In general, any former member of the armed forces who served on active duty (other than for training) and whose last service terminated honorably is eligible for inurnment. Eligibility for inurnment is described fully in 32 C.F.R. § 553.15a.

Prohibitions against interment or memorialization
Congress has from time to time created prohibited categories of persons that, even if otherwise eligible for burial, lose that eligibility. One such prohibition is against certain persons who are convicted of committing certain state or federal capital crimes, as defined in 38 U.S. Code § 2411. Capital crime is a specifically defined term in the statute, and for state offenses can include offenses that are eligible for a life sentence (with or without parole). The reasoning for this provision originally was to prevent Timothy McVeigh from being eligible at Arlington National Cemetery, but it has since been amended to prevent others.

Also prohibited under the same statute are those determined, with clear and convincing evidence, to have avoided such conviction by death or flight.

Notable burials

The first soldier to be buried in Arlington was Private William Henry Christman of Pennsylvania on May 13, 1864. There are 396 Medal of Honor recipients buried in Arlington National Cemetery.

Five state funerals have been held at Arlington: those of Presidents William Howard Taft and John F. Kennedy, his two brothers, Senator Robert F. Kennedy and Senator Edward "Ted" Kennedy, as well as General of the Armies John J. Pershing. Whether or not they were wartime service members, U.S. presidents are eligible to be buried at Arlington, since they oversaw the armed forces as commanders-in-chief.

Among the most frequently visited sites in the cemetery is the grave of President John F. Kennedy and Jacqueline Kennedy, who is buried nearby along with their son Patrick and their stillborn daughter Arabella. The grave is marked with an "eternal flame". The remains of his brothers, Senator Robert F. Kennedy and Senator Edward M. "Ted" Kennedy, are buried nearby. The latter two graves are marked with simple crosses and footstones. On December 1, 1971, Robert Kennedy's body was re-interred  from its original June 1968 burial site.

Two of the astronauts who were killed on January 27, 1967, by a flash fire inside the Apollo 1 Command Module, Gus Grissom and Roger Chaffee, are buried at the cemetery. John Glenn, the first American to orbit Earth and a longtime U.S. Senator from Ohio, was buried at the cemetery in April 2017.

British diplomat and Field Marshal Sir John Dill was buried at the cemetery when he died in Washington D.C. during World War II. The equestrian statue on Dill's grave is one of only two such statues at the cemetery; the other is Major General Philip Kearny's.

Lauri Törni, known for having served in the Finnish army during the Winter War, the German army during World War II, and the US army during the Vietnam War is buried at Arlington. He is the only former member of the Waffen-SS to be interred here.

Visitor requirements
In 2016, the cemetery announced policies and procedures that limit visitor access to the cemetery's grounds, some of which were thought could create delays for visitors.

Bicycle use
Pursuant to the Department of the Army final rule established in 2016, the cemetery's bicycle policy states bicycling presents a potential safety hazard, and is only allowed on its grounds with a family pass.

Security procedures
In September 2016, acting superintendent of the cemetery Hallinan announced that the cemetery was increasing security measures for its visitors. In addition to random identification checks and other security measures already in place, the cemetery would require pedestrians to enter at set access points: the main entrance on Memorial Avenue, the Ord and Weitzel gate, and the Old Post Chapel gate at Joint Base Myer-Henderson Hall. Before entering the cemetery through its main entrance, all pedestrians are now screened through the cemetery's Welcome Center. All vehicle access requires presenting valid, government-issued photo identification, such as a driver's license or passport, when entering the cemetery. Vehicles are also subject to random inspections. Hallinan stated that these processes could result in delays when entering the cemetery.

See also
 List of national cemeteries
 McKee Grave
 Theodore Wint Grave
 United States Department of Veterans Affairs emblems for headstones and markers

Notes

References
 
 
 
 
 
 
 
 
 
 
 
 Webcast Author Interview at the Pritzker Military Museum & Library on May 27, 2010
  Via

Further reading
  Memories of American war dead. online summary by author

External links

 
 Grave finding link (official)
 Memorial Tree listing (official)
 History of Arlington Cemetery and Arlington House by National Park Service
 Arlington Cemetery: Hallowed Ground, a March 11, 2010 Life magazine article (archived copy)
 Arlington National Cemetery, a 2014 WETA-TV video
 CWGC: Arlington National Cemetery at the Commonwealth War Graves Commission (CWGC)
 Archive of ArlingtonCemetery.net An unofficial website listing interments, has researched information from a civilian non-employee, current site no longer maintained.
 Wreaths Across America official site
 Historic American Buildings Survey (HABS) links
 Old Potting House, Arlington National Cemetery, Arlington, Arlington County, VA at HABS
 Arlington National Cemetery, Old Amphitheater, Arlington, Arlington County, VA at HABS
 Arlington National Cemetery, Ord-Weitzel Gate, Arlington, Arlington County, VA at HABS
 Arlington National Cemetery, USS Maine Memorial, Arlington, Arlington County, VA at HABS
 Arlington National Cemetery, Columns and Gates, Arlington, Arlington County, VA at HABS

 
1864 establishments in Virginia
Cemeteries on the National Register of Historic Places in Virginia
Commonwealth War Graves Commission cemeteries in the United States
Historic American Buildings Survey in Virginia
Historic districts on the National Register of Historic Places in Virginia
Monuments and memorials in Virginia
National Register of Historic Places in Arlington County, Virginia
Protected areas of Arlington County, Virginia
Robert E. Lee
Tombs of presidents of the United States
Tourist attractions in Arlington County, Virginia
United States national cemeteries